The Wintergreen Summer Music Festival and Academy (WSMF) is a four-week-long event held at Wintergreen Resort in Virginia's Blue Ridge Mountains. The event has been held yearly since 1995. It is produced by its parent organization, Wintergreen Music (Wintergreen Performing Arts, Inc.). WSMF includes performances by the Wintergreen Festival Orchestra, which performs public concerts each Saturday and Sunday of the four weeks in the Dunnlop Pavilion (formerly the John D. Evans Center.)

WSMF has been host to performers from around the world, including violinists Robert McDuffie and James Buswell, William Preucil, David Kim, and Roger Frisch; cellists Janos Starker, Julie Albers, and Zuill Bailey; pianist Norman Kreiger; conductors Peter Oundjian, Mei-Ann Chen, Carl St. Clair, Victor Yampolsky, Josep Caballé Domenech; soprano Arianna Zukerman; composers Daron Hagen, Eric Ewazen, Lawrence Dillon, Michael White, Ricardo Lorenz, and Ken Steen.

Wintergreen Summer Music Academy is a chamber music intensive program for advanced high school through doctoral students who play violin, viola, and cello. Under the auspices of the Festival, they present multiple weekly concerts. WSMA also produces the Lotte Lehmann Vocal Masterclasses, the Composition Academy, and the Quartet Fellowship Program.

WSMF has been home to the American Sinfonietta (1997-1998), the Richmond Symphony (1999), and now imports orchestral musicians and university professors from around the country (2000–present). In recent years, the Festival has included guest performers of various styles including rock, jazz, pop and bluegrass in addition to masterclasses and educational seminars.

Artistic Leadership: Dr. Erin Freeman, Artistic Director (2014–present) Dr. Larry Alan Smith, Artistic and Executive Director (2006-2014) David Wiley, Artistic Director (1999-2006)

References

External links
Official site
Wintergreen Resort
Wintergreen Property Owners Association
OurWintergreen
Wintergreen Adaptive Sports

Music festivals in Virginia
Classical music festivals